Central Manitoulin is a township in the Canadian province of Ontario. It is located on Manitoulin Island and in Manitoulin District.

Communities
The primary community and administrative centre of the township is Mindemoya. Smaller communities include Big Lake, Britainville, Dryden's Corner, Gibraltar, Grimsthorpe, Long Bay, Monument Corner, Old Spring Bay, Perivale, Providence Bay, Sandfield and Spring Bay.

Notable locations

Ontario has had a few historical claimants, by towns, for housing the province's smallest jail, the main three being: Tweed, Creemore and Coboconk. However, old jailhouses in Providence Bay, Port Dalhousie, Rodney, and ghost town Berens River have proven to be even smaller. The jailhouse in Providence Bay is now a cabin for tourists to stay at.  Treasure Island, the largest island in a lake on an island in a lake, is located in Central Manitoulin, in Lake Mindemoya.  The largest lake in a lake, Lake Manitou, is also mainly located in Central Manitoulin.

Demographics 

See also
List of townships in Ontario

References

External links

Municipalities in Manitoulin District
Single-tier municipalities in Ontario